Kozhithodu is a tributary of the Pamba River, the third longest river in the South Indian state of Kerala. It separates Aranmula and Edayaranmula. This stream is located in Pathanamthitta District.

Rivers of Pathanamthitta district
Pamba River